Haag in Oberbayern is a municipality in the district of Mühldorf in Bavaria in Germany, in December 2013 the municipality had a population of 6359.

Geography 
Haag is situated about 50 km east of Munich, 15 km south of Dorfen, 21 km west of  Waldkraiburg, 14 km north of Wasserburg am Inn, and 32 km from the county seat in Mühldorf. Via the Bundesstraße 15 the distance to Landshut is 48 km. Rosenheim is 38 km away.

Notable residents
 Karl Gebhardt (1897–1948), Nazi SS physician who conducted criminal medical experiments, executed for war crimes

References

Mühldorf (district)
Bavarian Circle